Gemert is a town in the Dutch province of North Brabant. It is located in the municipality of Gemert-Bakel.

Gemert was a separate municipality until 1997, when it merged with Bakel.

The spoken language is Peellands (an East Brabantian dialect, which is very similar to colloquial Dutch).

Population centres
The population centres from Gemert are Handel, De Mortel and Elsendorp.
Gemert also has a little chapel village called Esdonk and a Protestant mining village called Vossenberg.

Notable people born in Gemert
 Georgius Macropedius
 Lawrence Torrentinus
 
 Leon Vlemmings
 Jan van Gemert

Places of interest

Castle and Castle Park
The construction of the castle began in 1391. Till 1794 the castle was used by the German Order. In 1916 the castle was used as a mission monastic. The castle has a Castle Park in English style. In the park there is also the liberation monument from World War II.

Museums
Het Boerenbondsmuseum is a museum in Gemert. In this museum there are some objects and some buildings about the farmerpopulation near Gemert around 1900.

Religious buildings
Gemert has two churches:
 De Kerk van Sint-Jans Onthoofding.
 Sint-Gerardus Majellakerk.
Gemert has also one monastery:
 Klooster Nazareth.

Gallery

References

Municipalities of the Netherlands disestablished in 1997
Populated places in North Brabant
Former municipalities of North Brabant
Gemert-Bakel